Dragon Knight 4 (ドラゴンナイト４) is an erotic role-playing video game developed by ELF Corporation and released only in Japan for several platforms between 1994 and 1997. In 1994, the game first became available for PC MS-DOS, NEC PC-9801 and X68000, with a censored version ported to the Super Nintendo Entertainment System in 1996 and later to the PC-FX, PlayStation and Sega Saturn in 1997. It was also adapted into illustrated novels and an anime miniseries.

Dragon Knight 4 is a continuation of the Dragon Knight series, and a sequel to Knights of Xentar. Dragon Knight 4 has a new protagonist, Kakeru, the son of Takeru from the previous games.

Gameplay
The game features a turn-based battle system, with the player in control of up to eight additional characters. Allies and enemies are both separated into statistically distinct classes: swordsmen, archers and sorcerers, with certain armour and weaponry being appropriate to each.

Plot
The central character of Dragon Knight 4 is Kakeru (カケル) (voiced by Megumi Ogata), the son of Yamato Takeru, the protagonist of the earlier games in the series, and the sorceress Luna. At the outset, the player is informed of the wizard Lushifon's plot to destroy civilization and must guide Kakeru through a number of battles to defeat  Lushifon.

Release
The original DOS, FM Towns and PC-98 versions of the game feature erotic scenes. Banpresto removed these aspects before re-publishing the game for the SNES, PC-FX and PlayStation platforms. A third remake brought the game into the third dimension and brought back the erotic scenes.

Other media
The original soundtrack Dragon Knight 4 Complete Music File was released by NEC Avenue. Media Works also published a three-volume manga by Togashi in 1997–1999.

Two different illustrated novelization were published. A three-volume novel was written by Rei Marimura, illustrated by Masaki Takei, and released by Wani Books in 1994–1995. The second, two-volume novel was written by Youko Kagura, illustrated also by Masaki Takei, and released by Kill Time Communication in 2007–2008.

A two-volume anime OVA of two episodes each was produced by Dangun Pictures and released by Pink Pineapple in 1998–1999.

Reception
Retro Gamer included it on their list of Top Ten PC-FX Games, commenting that "visually this is one of the more attractive PC-FX titles available and it's ably assisted by a moderately deep and engaging battle system, not to mention a half-decent storyline."

References

External links
 (Windows)
 (FM Towns)
Dragon Knight 4 at MobyGames
Dragon Knight 4 at GameFAQs

Anime
Official website: D-1 and D-2

1994 video games
2007 video games
Banpresto games
DOS games
Eroge
ELF Corporation games
FM Towns games
Japan-exclusive video games
NEC PC-9801 games
PlayStation (console) games
Sega Saturn games
PC-FX games
X68000 games
Super Nintendo Entertainment System games
Video games developed in Japan
Windows games